Steve Rapp (born November 18, 1971 in Lafayette, California) is an American motorcyclist who turned professional in 1996. He races in the MotoAmerica Superstock 1000 Championship aboard a BMW S1000RR.

Career 
Rapp gets wildcard race at Indianapolis.

Career Statistic

AMA Pro Road Racing

Grand Prix motorcycle racing 
(key)

External links 

 Steve Rapp's profile at AMAProRacing.com

1971 births
Living people
American motorcycle racers
MotoGP World Championship riders
AMA Superbike Championship riders